Kawawa may refer to:

Rashidi Kawawa (1926–2009), Prime Minister of Tanganyika in 1962 and of Tanzania in 1972 to 1977
Shudo Kawawa (born 1965), Japanese swimmer
Sofia Kawawa (née Selemani Mkwela, 1936–1994), Tanzanian activist, founder of the Tanzania Women's Union
Vita Kawawa (born 1964), Tanzanian politician and Member of Parliament